Invitation is the second solo studio album by the American artist Carrie Akre.

Track listing
Play - 4:29
House at the End of the World - 3:47
Mystery - 4:55
Catch Me If You Can - 3:50
Heaven - 6:42
Wishing You Well - 5:41
Not Yet - 4:51
Hope - 6:31
Invitation - 4:56
Out There Tonight - 3:16
Only Me - 5:36
Catch My Back - 2:28

Personnel
Carrie Akre - vocals, guitar, keyboards, vox organ
Tim Dijulio - guitar
Jason Harrod - guitar
Pat Gray - bass, guitar
Bill Palmer - violin
Carl Miller - trombone

External links

References

Carrie Akre albums
2002 albums